Wang He may refer to:

Wang He (skier) (born 1983), Chinese freestyle skier
Wang He (sailor) (born 1988), Chinese sports sailor